School District 126 may refer to:
 Alsip, Hazelgreen, Oak Lawn School District 126
 Zion-Benton Township High School District 126